Blaize is a surname. Notable people with the surname include:

 Herbert Blaize (1918–1989), Grenadian politician
 Immodesty Blaize (born 1978), English burlesque dancer
 Richard Beale Blaize (1844–1904), Nigerian-Sierra Leonean businessman, newspaper publisher, and financier

Surnames from given names